"Dni, których nie znamy" (from Polish: Days, that we don't know yet) is a Polish language song written by Marek Grechuta and composed by Jan Kanty Pawluśkiewicz. The song was published in 1971 on the album Korowód made by the Grechuta together with Anawa, an instrumental band.

In popular culture 
The song has become one of most popular entertainment songs written in Polish. It was covered by many artists including: Michał Bajor, Kr'shna Brothers, Meza, Anna Treter, Plateau, Kamil Bednarek, duets of Grzegorz Turnau and Dorota Miśkiewicz and Maryla Rodowicz and Piotr Kupicha.

It is commonly regarded among the fans of Korona Kielce football club as its unofficial anthem.

The song was used in the 2015 short film Twardowsky that was part of science fiction and fantasy film series Polish Legends produced by Tomasz Bagiński, Allegro and Platige Image.

References 

1971 songs
1971 singles
Polish-language songs